The Église Saint-Roch, in the parish of Notre-Dame de Saint-Roch is the largest church in Quebec City, Quebec, Canada. It was constructed between 1914 and 1923. It is the fourth successive church of the same name to be constructed at the site.  The church lost its visual dominance of the city after the construction of a mall in 1974. The mall has since been demolished and today the church is at the heart of the revitalisation of the neighbourhood.

History of the parish
An epidemic hit the colony as the Recollects were building a hermitage which was then dedicated to Saint Roch, a patron saint of ailments, illness and dangers.  Saint Roch is also invoked against cholera, epidemics and plague, knee and skin problems, and is invoked to help bachelors, dogs, the falsely-accused, invalids, surgeons, and tile makers.

As the neighbourhood increased in population and activity, a newer, bigger church was needed, one that suited the new centre of Quebec City. The first public worship was held in 1917.

Current building
The design, by the same architects as the Sainte-Anne-de-Beaupré Basilica, combines a Gothic Revival exterior with a Romanesque Revival interior. The style was inspired by the work of Eugène-Emmanuel Viollet-le-Duc.

The steel-framed building is clad in black granite from nearby Rivière-à-Pierre and has two 45 metre steeples.

The interior is made of Saskatchewan marble that contains visible fossils. Inside is artisanal work, for example fine carpentry and sculpture in the oak furnishing, mosaic in the marble altar, and ironwork. The medieval-style windows show scenes of the New Testament, Old Testament, scenes from the religious history of Quebec, and scenes from the life of Saint Roch. The church contains masterpieces, including the Vision de Saint Roch by Jacques Blanchard, La Sainte Famille pendant la fuite en Égypte by Hyacinthe Collin de Vermont, and two paintings by Antoine Plamondon.

Gallery

See also
 Blessed Dina Bélanger

References

External links

 Église Saint-Roch, Québec

Roman Catholic churches completed in 1923
20th-century Roman Catholic church buildings in Canada
Gothic Revival church buildings in Canada
Romanesque Revival church buildings in Canada
Roman Catholic churches in Quebec City